The Immigration Act of 1924, or Johnson–Reed Act, including the Asian Exclusion Act and National Origins Act, was a United States federal law that prevented immigration from Asia and set quotas on the number of immigrants from Eastern and Southern Europe. It also authorized the creation of the country's first formal border control service, the U.S. Border Patrol, and established a "consular control system" that allowed entry only to those who first obtained a visa from a U.S. consulate abroad.

Enacted amid increasing public and political anxiety about the country's rapid social and demographic changes, the 1924 act supplanted earlier legislation by vastly reducing immigration for countries outside the Western Hemisphere: Immigrants from Asia were banned, and the total annual immigration quota for the rest of the world was capped at 165,000—an 80% reduction of the yearly average before 1914. The act temporarily reduced the annual quota of any nationality from 3% of their 1910 population, per the Emergency Quota Act of 1921, to 2% as recorded in the 1890 census; a new quota was implemented in 1927, based on each nationality's share of the total U.S. population in the 1920 census, which would govern U.S. immigration policy until 1965. 

According to the U.S. Department of State's Office of the Historian, the purpose of the act was "to preserve the ideal of U.S. homogeneity." Its chief author and namesake, U.S. Representative Albert Johnson, was a leading proponent of eugenics, justifying the act as a bulwark against "a stream of alien blood"; it likewise found support among racist and nativist groups such as the Ku Klux Klan. However, some proponents, such as the American Federation of Labor (AFL), welcomed the act for reducing cheap immigrant labor that would compete with local workers. Both public and Congressional opposition was minimal.

The 1924 act would define U.S. immigration policy for nearly three decades, until being substantially revised by the Immigration and Nationality Act of 1952 and ultimately replaced by the Immigration and Nationality Act of 1965.

Context

The Naturalization Act of 1790 declared that only people of European descent were eligible for naturalization, but eligibility was extended to people of African descent in the Naturalization Act of 1870. Chinese laborers and Japanese people were barred from immigrating to the U.S. in the 1882 Chinese Exclusion Act and the (unenforced) Gentlemen's Agreement of 1907, respectively.

A limitation on Southern and Eastern European immigration was first proposed in 1896 in the form of the literacy test bill. Henry Cabot Lodge was confident the bill would provide an indirect measure of reducing emigration from these countries, but after passing both Congress and the Senate, it was vetoed by President Cleveland. Another proposal for immigration restriction was introduced again in 1909 by U.S. Senator Henry Cabot Lodge. The Immigration Act of 1917 restricted immigration further in a variety of ways. It increased restrictions on Asian immigration, raised the general immigrant head tax, excluded those deemed to be diseased or mentally unwell, and in light of intense lobbying by the Immigration Restriction League, introduced the literacy test for all new immigrants to prove their ability to read English. In the wake of the post-World War I recession, many Americans believed that bringing in more immigrants would worsen the unemployment rate. The First Red Scare of 1919–1921 had fueled fears of foreign radicals migrating to undermine American values and provoke an uprising like the 1917 Bolshevik Revolution in Russia. The number of immigrants entering the United States decreased for about a year from July 1919 to June 1920 but doubled in the year after that.

U.S. Representative Albert Johnson, a eugenics advocate, and Senator David Reed were the two main architects of the act. In the wake of intense lobbying, it passed with strong congressional support. There were nine dissenting votes in the Senate and a handful of opponents in the House of Representatives, the most vigorous of whom was freshman Brooklyn Representative, Emanuel Celler, a Jewish American. Decades later, he pointed out the act's "startling discrimination against central, eastern and southern Europe."

Proponents of the act sought to establish a distinct American identity by preserving its ethnic homogeneity. Reed told the Senate that earlier legislation "disregards entirely those of us who are interested in keeping American stock up to the highest standard—that is, the people who were born here." He believed that immigrants from Southern and Eastern Europe, most of whom were Catholics or Jews, arrived sick and starving, were less capable of contributing to the American economy, and were unable to adapt to American culture. Eugenics was used as justification for the act's restriction of certain races or ethnicities of people to prevent the spread of perceived feeblemindedness in American society. Samuel Gompers, himself a Jewish immigrant from Britain and the founder of the American Federation of Labor (AFL), supported the act because he opposed the cheap labor that immigration represented even though the act would sharply reduce Jewish immigration. Both the AFL and the Ku Klux Klan supported the act.

Lobbyists from the West Coast, where a majority of Japanese, Korean, and other East Asian immigrants had settled, were especially concerned with excluding Asian immigrants. The 1882 Chinese Exclusion Act had already slowed Chinese immigration, but as Japanese andto a lesser degreeKorean and Filipino laborers began arriving and putting down roots in Western United States, an exclusionary movement formed in reaction to the "Yellow Peril." Valentine S. McClatchy, the founder of The McClatchy Company and a leader of the anti-Japanese movement, argued, "They come here specifically and professedly for the purpose of colonizing and establishing here permanently the proud Yamato race." He cites their supposed inability to assimilate to American culture and the economic threat that they posed to white businessmen and farmers.

Opposing the act, U.S. Secretary of State Charles Evans Hughes said, "The legislation would seem to be quite unnecessary, even for the purpose for which it is devised." The act faced strong opposition from the Japanese government with which the U.S. government had maintained a cordial economic and political relationship. In Japan, the bill was called by some the "Japanese Exclusion" act. Japanese Foreign Minister Matsui Keishirō instructed the Japanese ambassador to the United States, Masanao Hanihara, to write to Hughes:

Members of the Senate interpreted Hanihara's phrase "grave consequences" as a threat, which was used by hardliners of the bill to fuel both houses of Congress to vote for it. Because 1924 was an election year and he was unable to form a compromise, President Calvin Coolidge declined to use his veto power to block the act, although both houses passed it by a veto-overriding two-thirds majority. The act was signed into law on May 24, 1924.

Provisions
The immigration act made permanent the basic limitations on immigration to the United States established in 1921 and modified the National Origins Formula, which had been established in that year. In conjunction with the Immigration Act of 1917, it governed American immigration policy until the Immigration and Nationality Act of 1952 was passed, which revised it completely.

The act provided that no alien ineligible to become a citizen could be admitted to the United States as an immigrant. That was aimed primarily at Japanese aliens although they were not explicitly named in the act. It imposed fines on transportation companies who landed aliens in violation of U.S. immigration law. It defined the term "immigrant" and designated all other alien entries into the United States as "non-immigrant," or temporary visitors. It also established classes of admission for such non-immigrants.

The act set a total immigration quota of 165,000 for countries outside the Western Hemisphere, an 80% reduction from average before World War I, and barred immigrants from Asia, including Japan. However, the Philippines was then a U.S. colony and so its citizens were U.S. nationals and could thus travel freely to the United States. The act did not include China since it was already barred under the Chinese Exclusion Act.

The 1924 act reduced the annual quota of any nationality from 3% of their 1910 population (as defined by the Emergency Quota Act of 1921) to 2% of the number of foreign-born persons of any nationality residing in the United States according to the 1890 census. A more recent census existed, but at the behest of a eugenics subcommittee chaired by eugenicist Madison Grant, Congress used the 1890 one to increase immigrants from Northern and Western Europe and to decrease those from Eastern and Southern Europe. According to Commonweal, the act "relied on false nostalgia for a census that only seemed to depict a homogenous, Northern European–descended nation: in reality, 15 percent of the nation were immigrants in 1890."

The 1890-based quotas were set to last until 1927, when they would be replaced by of a total annual quota of 150,000, proportional to the national origins figures from the 1920 census. However, this did little to diversify the nations from which immigrants came from because the 1920 census did not include Blacks, Mulattos, and Asians as part of the American population used for the quotas. The lowest quota per country was 100 individuals, but even then only those eligible for citizenship could immigrate to the U.S. (i.e. only whites in China could immigrate). Establishing national origin quotas for the country proved to be a difficult task, and was not accepted and completed until 1929. The act gave 85% of the immigration quota to Northern and Western Europe and those who had an education or had a trade. The other 15% went disproportionately to Eastern and Southern Europe.

The act established preferences under the quota system for certain relatives of U.S. residents, including their unmarried children under 21, their parents, and spouses at least 21 and over. It also preferred immigrants at least 21 who were skilled in agriculture and their wives and dependent children under 16. Non-quota status was accorded to wives and unmarried children under 18 of U.S. citizens; natives of Western Hemisphere countries, with their families; non-immigrants; and certain others.

Subsequent amendments eliminated certain elements of the law's inherent discrimination against women.

Quota calculation formula 
In 1927, the 1924 act was modified to use census data from 1920. The Bureau of the Census and Department of Commerce estimated the National Origins of the White Population of the United States in 1920 in numbers, then calculated the percentage share each nationality made up. The National Origins Formula derived quotas by calculating the equivalent proportion of each nationality out of a total pool of 150,000 annual quota immigrants, with a minimum quota of 100. This formula was used until the Immigration and Nationality Act of 1952 adopted a simplified formula limiting each country to a flat quota of one-sixth of one percent of that nationality's 1920 population count, with a minimum quota of 100.

Quotas by country under successive laws 
Listed below are historical quotas on emigration from the Eastern Hemisphere, by country, as applied in given fiscal years ending June 30, calculated according to successive immigration laws and revisions from the Emergency Quota Act of 1921 to the final quota year of 1965. The 1922 and 1925 systems based on dated census records of the foreign-born population were intended as temporary measures; the 1924 Act's National Origins Formula based on the 1920 census of the total U.S. population took effect on July 1, 1929.

Visas and border control 
The act also established the "consular control system" of immigration, which divided responsibility for immigration between the U.S. State Department and the Immigration and Naturalization Service. The act also mandated no alien to be allowed to enter the United States without a valid immigration visa issued by an American consular officer abroad.

Consular officers were now allowed to issue visas to eligible applicants, but the number of visas to be issued by each consulate annually was limited, and no more than 10% of the quota could be given out in any one month. Aliens were not able to leave their home countries before having a valid visa, as opposed to the old system of deporting them at ports of debarkation. That gave a double layer of protection to the border since if they were found to be inadmissible, immigrants could still be deported on arrival.

Establishment of Border Patrol
The National Origins Act authorized the formation of the United States Border Patrol, which was established two days after the act was passed, primarily to guard the Mexico–United States border. A $10 tax was imposed on Mexican immigrants, who were allowed to continue immigrating based on their perceived willingness to provide cheap labor.

Results

The act was seen in a negative light in Japan, causing resignations of ambassadors and protests. A citizen committed seppuku near the U.S. Embassy in Tokyo with a note that read: "Appealing to the American people". American businesses situated in Japan suffered the economic brunt of the legislation's repercussions, as the Japanese government subsequently increased tariffs on American trading by '100 per cent'.

Passage of the Immigration Act has been credited with ending a growing democratic movement in Japan during this time period, and opening the door to Japanese militarist government control. According to David C. Atkinson, on the Japaneses government's perception of the act, "this indignity is seen as a turning point in the growing estrangement of the U.S. and Japan, which culminated in the 1941 attack on Pearl Harbor".

The act's revised formula reduced total emigration from 357,803 between 1923 and 1924 to 164,667 between 1924 and 1925. The law's impact varied widely by country. Emigration from Great Britain and Ireland fell 19%, while emigration from Italy fell more than 90%. From 1901 to 1914, 2.9 million Italians immigrated, an average of 210,000 per year. Under the 1924 quota, only 4,000 per year were allowed since the 1890 quota counted only 182,580 Italians in the U.S. By contrast, the annual quota for Germany after the passage of the act was over 55,000 since German-born residents in 1890 numbered 2,784,894. Germany, Britain, and Ireland had the highest representation in 1890. The provisions of the act were so restrictive that in 1924 more Italians, Czechs, Yugoslavs, Greeks, Lithuanians, Hungarians, Poles, Portuguese, Romanians, Spaniards, Chinese, and Japanese left the United States than arrived as immigrants.

The law sharply curtailed emigration from those countries that were previously host to the vast majority of the Jews in the United States, almost 75% of whom emigrated from Russia alone. Because Eastern European immigration did not become substantial until the late 19th century, the law's use of the population of the United States in 1890 as the basis for calculating quotas effectively made mass migration from Eastern Europe, where the vast majority of the Jewish diaspora lived at the time, impossible. In 1929, the quotas were adjusted to one-sixth of 1% of the 1920 census figures, and the overall immigration limit reduced to 150,000. The law was not modified to aid the flight of Jewish refugees in the 1930s or 1940s despite the rise of Nazi Germany. The quotas were adjusted to allow more Jewish refugees after World War II, but without increasing immigration overall.

During World War II, the U.S. modified the act to set immigration quotas for their allies in China. The immigration quotas were eased in the Immigration and Nationality Act of 1952 and replaced in the Immigration and Nationality Act of 1965.

Legacy 
The act has been characterized as the culmination of decades of intentional exclusion of Asian immigrants.

According to a 2023 study in the American Economic Journal, the immigration restrictions did not benefit US-born workers. Farming, a sector of the economy highly reliant on migrant labor, shifted towards more capital-intensive forms of agriculture, whereas the mining industry, another immigrant-reliant industry, contracted.

Looking back on the significance of the act, Harry Laughlin, the eugenicist who served as expert advisor to the House Committee on Immigration during the legislative process, praised it as a political breakthrough in the adoption of scientific racism as a theoretical foundation for immigration policy. Due to the reliance upon eugenics in forming the policy, and growing public reception towards scientific racism as justification for restriction and racial stereotypes by 1924, the act has been seen as a piece of legislation that formalized the views of contemporary U.S. society. Historian Mae Ngai writes of the national origins quota system:

At one level, the new immigration law differentiated Europeans according to nationality and ranked them in a hierarchy of desirability. At another level, the law constructed a white American race, in which persons of European descent shared a common whiteness distinct from those deemed to be not white.

See also
 Anarchist Exclusion Act
 Anti-Italianism
 Antisemitism in the United States
 History of antisemitism in the United States
 Chinese Exclusion Act
 Gentlemen's Agreement of 1907
 History of immigration to the United States
 Immigration Act of 1917
 Indian Citizenship Act
 List of United States Immigration Acts
 Mexican Repatriation
 Nordicism
 Palmer Raids
 Racial Equality Proposal
 Racism in the United States
 Statue of Liberty National Monument
 White Australia policy

References
Footnotes

Citations

Further reading

External links
Statistics of who was allowed in after the Immigration Act of 1924
"'Shut the Door': A Senator Speaks for Immigration Restriction" – transcript of speech given before Congress by Sen. Ellison D. Smith, April 9, 1924
Eugenics Laws Restricting Immigration

Quotas defined in Immigration Law of 1924

1924 in international relations
1924 in American law
68th United States Congress
Anti-Asian sentiment in the United States
Anti-Chinese sentiment in the United States
Anti-Filipino sentiment
Anti-immigration politics in the United States
Anti-Italian sentiment
Anti-Japanese sentiment in the United States
Anti-Korean sentiment in the United States
Anti-Slavic sentiment
Asian-American issues
Eastern Europeans in the United States
Eugenics in the United States
Italian-American history
Presidency of Calvin Coolidge
United States federal immigration and nationality legislation
Repealed United States legislation
1924 in Judaism
May 1924 events
Immigration bans
Scientific racism